This is a list of the squads picked for the 2010 ICC Women's World Twenty20 tournament.

Australia
 Alex Blackwell (captain)
 Shelley Nitschke
 Jess Cameron
 Sarah Elliott
 Rene Farrell
 Rachael Haynes
 Alyssa Healy (wk)
 Julie Hunter
 Erin Osborne
 Ellyse Perry
 Leah Poulton
 Clea Smith
 Lisa Sthalekar
 Elyse Villani
 Jodie Fields (withdrawn)

England
 Charlotte Edwards (captain)
 Katherine Brunt
 Holly Colvin
 Lydia Greenway
 Jenny Gunn
 Danielle Hazell
 Heather Knight
 Laura Marsh
 Beth Morgan
 Nicky Shaw
 Anya Shrubsole
 Claire Taylor
 Sarah Taylor (wk)
 Danielle Wyatt

India
 Jhulan Goswami (captain)
 Anjum Chopra
 Soniya Dabir
 Diana David
 Anagha Deshpande
 Rumeli Dhar
 Harmanpreet Kaur
 Reema Malhotra
 Sulakshana Naik (wk)
 Mithali Raj
 Poonam Raut
 Priyanka Roy
 Amita Sharma
 Gouher Sultana

New Zealand
 Aimee Watkins (captain)
 Amy Satterthwaite
 Suzie Bates
 Erin Bermingham
 Kate Broadmore
 Nicola Browne
 Sophie Devine
 Natalie Dodd
 Lucy Doolan
 Maria Fahey
 Sara McGlashan (wk)
 Liz Perry
 Rachel Priest
 Sian Ruck

Pakistan
 Sana Mir (captain)
 Nain Abidi
 Armaan Khan
 Asmavia Iqbal
 Batool Fatima (wk)
 Bismah Maroof
 Javeria Khan
 Nida Dar
 Qanita Jalil
 Rabiya Shah
 Sadia Yousuf
 Sajjida Shah
 Sania Khan
 Urooj Mumtaz

South Africa
 Cri-zelda Brits (captain)
 Susan Benade
 Trisha Chetty (wk)
 Mignon du Preez
 Shandre Fritz
 Shabnim Ismail
 Ashlyn Kilowan
 Marcia Letsoalo
 Sunette Loubser
 Alicia Smith
 Angelique Taai
 Chloe Tryon
 Charlize van der Westhuizen
 Dane van Niekerk

Sri Lanka
 Chamani Seneviratna (captain)
 Dilani Manodara (wk)
 Suwini de Alwis
 Sandamali Dolawatte
 Hiruka Fernando
 Inoka Galagedara
 Chamari Atapattu
 Eshani Lokusuriyage
 Chamari Polgampola
 Udeshika Prabodhani
 Deepika Rasangika
 Dedunu Silva
 Sripali Weerakkody
 Chandi Wickramasinghe
 Shashikala Siriwardene (withdrawn)

West Indies
 Merissa Aguilleira (captain, wk)
 Kirbyina Alexander
 Shemaine Campbelle (wk)
 Britney Cooper
 Shanel Daley
 Deandra Dottin
 Cordel Jack
 Stacy-Ann King
 Pamela Lavine
 Anisa Mohammed
 Juliana Nero
 Shakera Selman
 Tremayne Smartt
 Stafanie Taylor

See also
 2010 ICC World Twenty20 squads

References

ICC Women's World Twenty20 squads
squads